Marenisco Township is a civil township of Gogebic County in the U.S. state of Michigan.  The population was 1,727 at the 2010 census, a significant increase from 1,051 at the 2000 census.

The name was formed by combining the first three letters from Mary Enid Scott, the wife of E. H. Scott, a timber producer

Geography
It is the second-largest township in land area in Michigan (after McMillan Township in Luce County).

Climate
The climate is described as Humid Continental by the Köppen Climate System, abbreviated as Dfb.

Notable people
 Arthur E. Stadler, (1892-?) was a member of the Wisconsin State Assembly, chairman of the town board of Owen, chairman and supervisor of the Clark County, Wisconsin Board

Demographics
As of the census of 2000, there were 1,051 people, 264 households, and 186 families residing in the township.  The population density was 3.4 per square mile (1.3/km).  There were 663 housing units at an average density of 2.1 per square mile (0.8/km).  The racial makeup of the township was 68.13% White, 27.31% Native American, 1.14% African American, 0.38% Asian, 1.33% from other races, and 1.71% from two or more races. Hispanic or Latino of any race were 2.95% of the population.

There were 264 households, out of which 25.4% had children under the age of 18 living with them, 61.7% were married couples living together, 6.8% had a female householder with no husband present, and 29.5% were non-families. 25.4% of all households were made up of individuals, and 9.8% had someone living alone who was 65 years of age or older.  The average household size was 2.37 and the average family size was 2.84.

In the township the population was spread out, with 12.7% under the age of 18, 17.7% from 18 to 24, 40.0% from 25 to 44, 18.5% from 45 to 64, and 11.2% who were 65 years of age or older.  The median age was 34 years. For every 100 females, there were 244.6 males.  For every 100 females age 18 and over, there were 279.3 males.

The median income for a household in the township was $33,438, and the median income for a family was $36,136. Males had a median income of $33,750 versus $22,917 for females. The per capita income for the township was $13,156.  About 6.2% of families and 9.6% of the population were below the poverty line, including 12.6% of those under age 18 and 1.9% of those age 65 or over.

Transportation

Major highways

Bus service
Indian Trails provides daily intercity bus service between St. Ignace and Ironwood, Michigan.

References

Townships in Gogebic County, Michigan
Townships in Michigan